Soomro or Soomra or Sumrah is a tribe having a local origin in Sindh who had later claimed to being either Rajputs or Arabs. They are found in Sindh, parts of Punjab especially bordering Sindh, Balochistan province, and the Kutch district of the Indian state of Gujarat and also Rajasthan. 

The Soomro tribe established the Soomra dynasty in 1025 CE, which re-established native Sindhi rule over Sindh since the Arab conquests.

Many members of the Soomro caste were one of the first in Sindh to convert to Islam from Hinduism but initially continued to maintain several Hindu customs and traditions.

Origins 
Many authors have presented conflicting accounts of Soomro's origins. Some say their origins to be of Rajputs who migrated to Sindh from Rajasthan by linking them to the Parmar clan of Rajputs. Others like Ahmad Hasan Dani claims that "of this there is no definite proof" though he too affirms that they originate in the Indian subcontinent. M. H. Panhwar, a Sindhologist, also rejects a Rajput origin and attributes its to James Todd but still accepts native origin. Some writers have detailed about a subdivision in Jats with the name "Sumra". But Historian André Wink has mentioned that the Soomras were not Jats.

He has also explained that Soomras who were of local Sindhi origin and had been semi-independent rulers after the death of Mahmud of Ghazni were different to pastoral-nomadic Jats or Mids. As per him, rise of Soomras was one of the factor in movement of the Jats of lower Sindh towards north. Ghulam Hussain and others argue that the Soomros and other native tribes indigenous to Sindh slowly began to 'Ashrafize' themselves by remaking their genealogies to further associate themselves with Syeds whom they possibly intermarried and acquired power through.

Some have said they entered sindh after it was conquered by Muhammad Bin Qasim and belonged to tribe of Banu Tamim. Mir Tahir Muhammad Nisyani, in his Tarikh Tahiri asserts that Soomras were originally Muslims . They converted to Hinduism but remained Muslim in their customs, dress and even in their names. Tarikh Waqa`i Rajisthan corroborates this viewpoint and confirms that Soomras were originally "Parmar Rajputs".

Pre-eminent sindh scholar Nabi Baksh Baloch tried to reconcile all different conflicting accounts of Soomra origin. He considered Soomras, a hybrid race that was mix of Sindhi-Arab blood, emerged after the Ummayad caliph Sulayman ibn Abd al-Malik’s decree asking Arab officers posted in Sindh to settle in the land permanently. Consequently they took Sindhi wives and subsequently married their daughters in Sindhi families.
Hence, Dr. Baloch writes that:Soomras were descendents of these hybrid princes, whose ancestors, according to common legend, were either Arabs or their grand-sons on the mothers’ side

References

Rajput clans
Surnames
Sindhi tribes
Maldhari communities